The 185th Infantry Division (185. Infanterie-Division) was a formation of the Imperial German Army in World War I.

References
 185. Infanterie-Division (Chronik 1915/1918) - Der erste Weltkrieg
 Franz Bettag, Die Eroberung von Nowo Georgiewsk. Schlachten des Weltkrieges, Bd. 8 (Oldenburg, 1926)
 Hermann Cron et al., Ruhmeshalle unserer alten Armee (Berlin, 1935)
 Hermann Cron, Geschichte des deutschen Heeres im Weltkriege 1914–1918 (Berlin, 1937)
 Erich von Falkenhayn, Der Feldzug der 9. Armee gegen die Rumänen und Russen, 1916/17 (Berlin, 1921)
 Oberstleutnant a. D. Dr. Curt Treitschke, Der Rückmarsch aus Rumänien. Mit der Mackensen-Armee vom Sereth durch Siebenbürgen nach Sachsen (Dresden 1938)
 Günter Wegner, Stellenbesetzung der deutschen Heere 1825–1939. (Biblio Verlag, Osnabrück, 1993), Bd. 1
 Histories of Two Hundred and Fifty-One Divisions of the German Army which Participated in the War (1914-1918), compiled from records of Intelligence section of the General Staff, American Expeditionary Forces, at General Headquarters, Chaumont, France 1919 (1920)

Infantry divisions of Germany in World War I